The men's 200 metre backstroke competition at the 2002 Pan Pacific Swimming Championships took place on August 27–28 at the Yokohama International Swimming Pool.  The last champion was Lenny Krayzelburg of US.

This race consisted of four lengths of the pool, all in backstroke.

Records
Prior to this competition, the existing world and Pan Pacific records were as follows:

Results
All times are in minutes and seconds.

Heats
The first round was held on August 27.

Semifinals
The semifinals were held on August 27.

Final 
The final was held on August 28.

References

2002 Pan Pacific Swimming Championships